Clément-Panhard was a type of auto-mobile manufactured from 1898. Adolphe Clément was a director of Panhard-Levassor, and when the factory could not meet the production requirements for circa 500 units of the 1898 'voiture légère' ('dog cart') model, he undertook manufacture under licence at his factory in Levallois-Perret. It was designed by airship pioneer Commandant Arthur Krebs, of Panhard, and used a tubular chassis, centre-pivot steering, near-horizontal  rear-mounted engine with automatic inlet valve and hot-tube ignition, driving through a constant-mesh gear-train, and final drive by side chains and early models had no reverse gear.

It is virtually identical to both the Stirling-Panhards and Clément-Stirlings that were imported into Great Britain by the Scottish coachbuilder 'Stirling'.

English patent is dated 09/02/1899.

Gallery

References

External links
 Clément-Panhard - Sound file and Video of Dog cart.
 The Stirling Miniature Brouham, the 1902 Stirling Light Dogccart.
 The Stirling Light Delivery van: "Simple, Reliable, Attractive, Economical, Expeditious." - The Stirling Parisian Phaeton: "Up-to-date, the fashionable light car, can be driven by a Lady".
 The 1902 Stirling Light Dogcart: "Up-to-date, latest improvements".
 "If you value your life ... don't buy an Experimental or untried car."
 The Stirling cars: The light car DE LUXE, The "John O' Groater".
 1901 - "The record for crossing England from the North to the South West, from John O' Groats to Land's End, has just been beaten by M. J. Stirling. Leaving on July 30 in the morning from John O' Groats, he arrived 59 hours later at Land's End which is 847 miles from the start."
 1901 - Automobiles in the Glasgow International Exposition: Stirling Parisian Phaeton

Defunct motor vehicle manufacturers of France
Vehicle manufacturing companies established in 1898
Companies based in Paris 
Vintage vehicles
Brass Era vehicles